Aurora Anguilla is a five-star resort hotel in South Hill, Anguilla. Until 2021, it was known as the CuisinArt Resort and Spa.

It was founded after Leandro Rizzuto, owner of Conair Corporation and its subsidiary Cuisinart, purchased the property with the intention of making it a private home. However, since Anguilla does not permit foreigners to build beachfront homes, he chose to make it a hotel instead. It opened in November 1999.

It was sold to Richard M. Schulze's Olympus Ventures around 2020. Salamander Hotels and Resorts took over management in April 2022.

The resort is inspired by the Greek island of Mykonos. It contains wicker furniture and Haitian paintings on the walls. The formal evening restaurant of the hotel is Santorini and the informal Meditarraneo bar is by the pool. Its Venus Spa contains 16 treatment rooms and a heated Thalasso pool of seawater. The resort contains a notable hydroponic farm which is said to offer an opportunity for excellent practical training for students completing their degree or technical diploma program. It contains greenhouses covering some 18,000 square feet, manufactured by Agra Tech, Inc and two ponds which are used to grow bibb lettuce.

References

External links
 

Hotels in Anguilla
Buildings and structures completed in 1999
Hotels established in 1999
Hotel buildings completed in 1999
1999 establishments in British Overseas Territories